Appalam is a 2011 Malaysian comedy-drama film directed by Afdlin Shauki. It is a Tamil-language remake of the film Papadom, also directed by Afdlin. The comedy revolves around an overprotective father, Samy, who besides his own role as a dad to his only daughter Shruti, has to take on the mother role upon the sudden death of his wife.

The film  became the second Malaysian Tamil movie to be shot in 35-mm film format after the 1991 Malaysian Tamil film Naan Oru Malaysian. The film was released on 15 November 2011 in cinemas across Malaysia, Singapore, and Tamil Nadu, to positive  critical acclaim by critics. Appalam also emerged as the highest-grossing locally produced Tamil film of all time before beaten by Maindhan in 2014.

Plot
Appalasamy (Gana) and his wife Nalaini (Jaclyn Victor) is blessed with a beautiful girl called Shruthi (Raja Ilya). One fateful day, Nalaini gets into a car accident while on the phone arguing with Appalasamy. He promises to his late wife that he will take good care of their daughter, which leads him to become overprotective of her. When Shruthi turns 17 years old, she decides to continue her studies in performing arts  at Kuala Lumpur and to be more independent. Secretly, Appalasamy applies for work as a gardener in her college to look after her. Trouble starts to brew when a famous singer decides to court Shruthi.

Cast
 S. Gana as Appalasamy
 Raja Ilya as Shruti 
 Jaclyn Victor as  Nalaini
 Shashi Tharan as Booty Slap
 Sharifah Amani
 Afdlin Shauki
 Sathiya
 Chelsia Ng
 Haanii Shivraj
 Kristina Vinokree

Soundtrack

The soundtrack was composed by R. Lawrance.

Awards
 Malaysian Indian Film Festival 2012
  Best Film Award 
  Malaysian Tamil Awards 
 Best Film
 Best Actress Awards - Raja Ilya

References

Tamil diaspora in Malaysia
Malaysian comedy-drama films
2011 films
Tamil-language Malaysian films
2010s Tamil-language films
Remakes of Malaysian films
Films directed by Afdlin Shauki
Tayangan Unggul films
Films with screenplays by Afdlin Shauki
Astro Shaw films
Films produced by Gayatri Su-Lin Pillai